Collinsella stercoris  is a Gram-positive and anaerobic bacterium from the genus of Collinsella which has been isolated from human feces in Japan.

References

 

Coriobacteriaceae
Bacteria described in 2000